Geir Sverrisson is a paralympic athlete from Iceland competing mainly in category TS4 sprint events.

Geir competed in four Paralympics, competing in two different sports medaling in both.  His first games in 1988 he competed in the swimming events, winning a silver in the 100m breaststroke behind Australian Greg Hammond in a new world record time, he also swam in the 100m freestyle finishing fourth and the 200m medley finishing fifth.  At the 1992 Summer Paralympics Geir broke the games record to win the gold in the 100m breaststroke and finished seventh in his heat of the 100m freestyle, he also competed on the track winning a silver in the 100m, finishing fourth in the 200m and 400m.  At the 1996 Summer Paralympics Geir competed in just track and field winning three silvers in the 100m, 200m and 400m.  Geir also competed in the 2000 Summer Paralympics competing in the same three events he failed to make the final in the 100m and 200m and could only manage seventh.

References

External links
 

Geir Sverrisson
Geir Sverrisson
Swimmers at the 1988 Summer Paralympics
Swimmers at the 1992 Summer Paralympics
Athletes (track and field) at the 1992 Summer Paralympics
Athletes (track and field) at the 1996 Summer Paralympics
Athletes (track and field) at the 2000 Summer Paralympics
Geir Sverrisson
Geir Sverrisson
Geir Sverrisson
Geir Sverrisson
Geir Sverrisson
Geir Sverrisson
Living people
Year of birth missing (living people)
Medalists at the 1988 Summer Paralympics
Medalists at the 1992 Summer Paralympics
Medalists at the 1996 Summer Paralympics
Paralympic medalists in athletics (track and field)
Paralympic medalists in swimming
S9-classified Paralympic swimmers
Sprinters with limb difference
Paralympic sprinters